Botoš is a village located in the Zrenjanin municipality, in the Central Banat District of Serbia. It is situated in the Autonomous Province of Vojvodina. The village has a Serb ethnic majority (89.43%) and its population numbering 2,148 people (2002 census).

Name

In Serbian, the village is known as Botoš or Ботош, in Hungarian as Bótos, and in German as Botosch.

Historical population

1961: 3,305
1971: 2,820
1981: 2,569
1991: 2,436
2002: 2,148
2011: 1,860

Notable inhabitants
Miomir Vukobratović, pioneer of engineering in field of huumaniod robots is born in Botoš.

See also
List of places in Serbia
List of cities, towns and villages in Vojvodina

References
Slobodan Ćurčić, Broj stanovnika Vojvodine, Novi Sad, 1996.

External links 

 Botoš

Zrenjanin
Populated places in Serbian Banat